DRDGOLD Limited (formerly Durban Roodepoort Deep Limited) is a  South African gold producer and a specialist in the recovery of the metal from the retreatment of surface tailings. The company is listed on the New York and Johannesburg stock exchanges. Their financial year ends on 30 June.

References

Companies listed on the New York Stock Exchange
Companies listed on the Johannesburg Stock Exchange
Companies based in Johannesburg